The Joint Mathematics Meetings (JMM) is a mathematics conference hosted annually in early January by the American Mathematical Society (AMS). Frequently, several other national mathematics organizations also participate. The meeting is the largest gathering of mathematicians in the United States, and the largest annual meeting of mathematicians in the world.  For example, more than 6000 people attended the 2017 JMM.  Several thousand talks, panels, minicourses, and poster sessions are held each year.

The JMM also hosts an Employment Center, which is a focal point for the hiring process of academic mathematicians, especially for liberal arts colleges. Many employers conduct their preliminary interview process at the meeting.  Often these interviews take place outside the confines of the conference, so the employers may not appear on the official Employment Center listing.

Future Meetings 
 San Francisco, CA, January 3–6, 2024
 Seattle, WA, January 8-11, 2025
 Washington, D.C., January 4-7, 2026

Past Meetings 
 Boston, MA, January 4-7, 2023 link
 Virtual, April 6-9, 2022  (the originally scheduled meeting in Seattle, WA, January 5-8, had been postponed due to concerns of the Omicron variant of COVID-19)
 Virtual, January 6–9, 2021 (the originally scheduled in-person meeting in Washington, D.C. was canceled due to COVID-19)
 Denver, CO, January 15–18, 2020 link
 Baltimore, MD, January 16–19, 2019 link
 San Diego, CA, January 10-13, 2018 link
 Atlanta, GA, January 4–7, 2017 link
Seattle, WA, January 6–9, 2016, link
 San Antonio, TX, January 10–13, 2015, link
 Baltimore, MD, January 15–18, 2014 link
 San Diego, CA, January 9–12, 2013 link
 Boston, MA, January 4–7, 2012 link
 New Orleans, LA,  January 6–9, 2011 link
 San Francisco, CA, January 13–16, 2010 link
 Washington, D.C., January 5–8, 2009 link
 San Diego, CA, January 6–9, 2008 link
 New Orleans, LA, January 5–8, 2007 link
 San Antonio, TX, January 12–15, 2006 link
 Atlanta, GA, January 5–8, 2005 link
 Phoenix, AZ, January 7–10, 2004 link
 Baltimore, MD, January 15–18, 2003 link
 San Diego, CA, January 6–9, 2002 link
 New Orleans, LA, January 10–13, 2001 link
 Washington, D.C., January 19–22, 2000 link

See also 
 American Mathematical Society

External links 
 Listing of national AMS conferences
 Information about the Employment Center

References

American Mathematical Society
Mathematics conferences